Andrej Doležal (born 23 March 1981) is a Slovak politician. He serves as Minister of Transport and Construction .

References 

Living people
1981 births
Politicians from Bratislava
Government ministers of Slovakia
21st-century Slovak politicians